The Young Men's Muslim Association (Jam'iyyat al-Shubban al-Muslimin) was founded in Egypt in 1926. By the end of the decade it had around 15,000 members.  The leader of the YMMA in Palestine was  Izz al-din Qassam.

References 

 Dawisha, Adeed (2002). Arab Nationalism in the Twentieth Century: From Triumph to Despair. Princeton University Press. 

Y
Islamic youth organizations
Islamic organisations based in Egypt
Youth organisations based in Egypt
1927 establishments in Egypt
Islamic organizations established in 1928
Youth organizations established in 1928
Men's religious organizations